Carl Gunnar Emanuel Setterwall (18 August 1881 – 26 February 1928) was a Swedish tennis player who won four Olympic medals. In 1908 he won a bronze in the men's indoor doubles, alongside Wollmar Boström. Four years later he won three more medals. In the mixed doubles (with Sigrid Fick) and indoor doubles (with Carl Kempe) tournament he reached the final but lost both times. Sigrid Fick was also his partner in the mixed indoor event and together they won a bronze medal.

Setterwall's father, also named Carl, was a multimillionaire controlling much of iron works during the railway's development in Scandinavia. His son followed in his steps, eventually taking over the family firm.

References

External links

 
 

1881 births
1928 deaths
Swedish male tennis players
Olympic tennis players of Sweden
Tennis players at the 1908 Summer Olympics
Tennis players at the 1912 Summer Olympics
Olympic silver medalists for Sweden
Olympic bronze medalists for Sweden
Tennis players from Stockholm
Olympic medalists in tennis
Medalists at the 1908 Summer Olympics
Medalists at the 1912 Summer Olympics